Kiss or Kill is the first and only studio album by the heavy metal band Endeverafter. It was released in 2007 on Razor & Tie.

"I Wanna Be Your Man" was included on the North American release of Guitar Hero On Tour: Modern Hits and released as downloadable content for Rock Band 2. A music video for "Baby Baby Baby" was also made to promote the album during its release. The song "No More Words" was used for former WWE Champion Jeff Hardy's theme song.

Track listing

References

2007 debut albums
Endeverafter albums
Razor & Tie albums